Lorna Doone is a 1963 British TV adaptation of the 1869 romance novel Lorna Doone by R. D. Blackmore. It aired on the BBC and ran for 11 episodes of 30 minutes each.

It starred Bill Travers and Jane Merrow.

Cast
Bill Travers as John Ridd
Jean Anderson as Mrs. Ridd
Andrew Faulds as Carver Doone
Janet Pate as Lizzie Ridd
Meg Wynn Owen as Annie Ridd
Norman Tyrrell as John Fry
Jane Merrow as Lorna Doone
John Bennett as Tom Faggus 
Mark Burns as Charlesworth Doone
Nigel Stock as Jeremy Stickles
Terence de Marneyas Counsellor Doone
Daphne Heard as Betty Muxworthy
Brian Hankins as Marwood de Whichelhalse
Patricia Brake as Gwenny Carfax

Production
In the early 1960s there were rival plans to film Lorna Doone for British TV by the BBC and British Granada. Granada claimed they registered their claim in 1961. Both approached Bill Travers to play the lead.

As of 2021, this was one of only two serialised adaptations made by the BBC (it was remade in 1976 starring Patrick Troughton). However, all 11 episodes of this 1963 version were later wiped by the corporation and are believed to be lost. A single photograph featured on the front cover of a Radio Times issue is all that exists.

References

External links

1963 British television series debuts
1963 British television series endings
1960s British drama television series
BBC television dramas
1960s British romance television series
1960s British television miniseries
Black-and-white British television shows
Films based on Lorna Doone
English-language television shows